Brayley is a lunar impact crater located in the southwest part of the Mare Imbrium. It was named after British geographer Edward W. Brayley in 1935. It has a circular rim and a low rise in the center. There are no notable craters overlapping the rim or interior. The sinuous rille Rima Brayley passes to the north of Brayley.

Satellite craters
By convention these features are identified on lunar maps by placing the letter on the side of the crater midpoint that is closest to Brayley.

References

External links

 LTO-39C1 Brayley — L&PI topographic map

Impact craters on the Moon
Mare Imbrium